Faunis kirata, the broad striped faun, is a butterfly in the family Nymphalidae. It was described by Lionel de Nicéville in 1891. It is found in Peninsular Malaya, Sumatra and Borneo in the Indomalayan realm.

References

External links
Faunis at Markku Savela's Lepidoptera and Some Other Life Forms

Faunis
Butterflies described in 1891